Bina or Tumi is a village in the Khojavend District of Azerbaijan, in the disputed region of Nagorno-Karabakh. The village had an ethnic Armenian-majority population prior to the 2020 Nagorno-Karabakh war, and also had an Armenian majority in 1989.

Toponymy 
The village was known as Domi during the Soviet period.

History 

During the Soviet period, the village was a part of the Hadrut District of the Nagorno-Karabakh Autonomous Oblast. 

The village was administered by the Republic of Artsakh as part of its Hadrut Province after the First Nagorno-Karabakh War. The village was captured in October 2020 by Azerbaijani forces during the 2020 Nagorno-Karabakh war with the Armenian population of the village having previously evacuated.

Historical heritage sites 
Historical heritage sites in and around the village include a cemetery from between the 9th and 19th centuries, the 11th-century Church of the Red Cross, a 12th/13th-century khachkar, a 12th/13th-century bridge, the fortress of Ghlen Kar (also known as Dizapayt Fortress and Gorozaberd) from between the 13th and 19th centuries, and a 19th-century spring monument.

Demographics 
The village had 760 inhabitants in 2005, and 746 inhabitants in 2015.

Gallery

References

External links 

 

Populated places in Khojavend District
Nagorno-Karabakh
Former Armenian inhabited settlements